President's Cup (known before 2005 as the National Championship) is said to be the first tournament in the Maldives and also the birth of Football in the Maldives. The very first tournament was held in 1946, with 2006 seeing its 50th edition. The first edition ended with Customs and Naadhee Ahthamadhun both sharing the trophy.

The current format of the President's Cup allows only the top four teams of the Dhivehi League to participate.

Winners

Maldives National Championship

 1947: 
 1948: not known
 1949: not known
 1950: not known
 1951: not known
 1952: not known
 1953: not known
 1954: not known
 1955: not known
 1956: not known
 1957: not known
 1958: not known
 1959: not known
 1960: not known
 1961: not known
 1962: not known
 1963: not known
 1964: not known
 1965: not known
 1966: not known
 1967: not known
 1968: not known
 1969: not known
 1970: not known
 1971: not known
 1972: not known
 1973: not known
 1974: ASA Nooraaneemaage
 1975: not known
 1976: not known
 1977: not known
 1978: not known
 1979: not known
 1980: not known
 1981: not known
 1982: not known
 1983: not known
 1984: not known
 1985: Victory Sports Club beat New Radiant SC
 1986: Victory Sports Club beat New Radiant SC
 1987: not known
 1988: not known
 1989: not known
 1990: not known
 1991: not known
 1992: not known
 1993: Club Valencia 7-0 New Radiant SC
 1994: not known
 1995: not known
 1996: Victory Sports Club  Club Valencia
 1997: New Radiant SC  Hurriyya SC
 1998: not known
 1999: Club Valencia  Hurra SC
 2000: Victory Sports Club New Radiant SC
 2001: not known
 2002: Victory Sports Club  Club Valencia
 2003: Victory Sports Club Club Valencia
 2004: New Radiant SC  Club Valencia Presidents's Cup

 2005: Victory Sports Club 1-0 New Radiant SC
 2006: Victory Sports Club 0-0 Club Valencia (aet, 3-1 pens) 2007: New Radiant SC 3-1 Victory Sports Club
 2008: Club Valencia 3-2 Victory Sports Club
 2009: Victory Sports Club 2-1 VB Sports
 2010: VB Sports 5-2 Victory Sports Club
 2011: Victory Sports Club 2-1 (aet) New Radiant SC
 2012: New Radiant SC 0-0 Victory Sports Club (aet, 2-1 pens)'''
 2013: New Radiant SC 4-2 (aet) Maziya S&RC
 2014: New Radiant SC 1-0 (aet) Club Eagles
 2015: Maziya S&RC 3-1 New Radiant SC
 2016: Club Eagles 1-0 (aet) TC Sports Club
 2017: New Radiant SC 3-0 TC Sports Club
 2021–22: Club Valencia 2-1 (aet)  Maziya S&RC

References

External links
 FAMaldives competitions (archived)

 
Football cup competitions in the Maldives
Dhivehi League